Rendle is the surname of:

 Alfred Barton Rendle (1865–1938), English botanist
 Andrew Rendle (a.k.a. Radio Rendle), presenter of 2002–07 British radio station Capital Disney
 Luke Rendle, drummer of the punk band Theatre of Hate and Crisis/The Straps
 Sharon Rendle (b. 1966), retired female judoka from the United Kingdom
 Thomas Rendle (b. 1986), British FIDE International Master chess player and coach
 Thomas Edward Rendle (1884–1946), English recipient of the Victoria Cross military award

See also
 Rendel
 Randall (disambiguation)